USS LST-913 was an  in the United States Navy. Like many of her class, she was not named and is properly referred to by her hull designation.

Construction
LST-913 was laid down on 15 March 1944, at Hingham, Massachusetts, by the Bethlehem-Hingham Shipyard; launched on 26 April 1944; and commissioned on 23 May 1944.

Service history
During World War II, LST-913 was assigned to the European theater and participated in the invasion of southern France in August and September 1944. She was then assigned to the Asiatic-Pacific theater and took part in the Leyte landings in November 1944, and the assault and occupation of Okinawa Gunto in June 1945.

Following the war, LST-913 performed occupation duty in the Far East until mid-December 1945. She returned to the United States and was decommissioned on 16 July 1946, and struck from the Navy list on 14 March 1947. On 18 June 1948, the ship was sold to the Humble Oil and Refining Co., Houston, Texas, for operation.

Awards
LST-913 earned three battle star for World War II service.

Notes

Citations

Bibliography 

Online resources

External links
 

 

LST-542-class tank landing ships
World War II amphibious warfare vessels of the United States
Ships built in Hingham, Massachusetts
1944 ships